Giuseppe Melfi (June 11, 1967) is an Italo-Swiss mathematician who works on practical numbers and modular forms.

Career
He gained his PhD in mathematics in 1997 at the University of Pisa. After some time spent at the University of Lausanne during 1997-2000, Melfi was appointed at the University of Neuchâtel, as well as at the University of Applied Sciences Western Switzerland and at the local University of Teacher Education.

Work
His major contributions are in the field of practical numbers. This prime-like sequence of numbers is known for having an asymptotic behavior and other distribution properties similar to the sequence of primes. Melfi proved two conjectures both raised in 1984 one of which is the corresponding of the Goldbach conjecture for practical numbers: every even number is a sum of two practical numbers. He also proved that there exist infinitely many triples of practical numbers of the form .

Another notable contribution has been in an application of the theory of modular forms, where he found new Ramanujan-type identities for the sum-of-divisor functions. His seven new identities extended the ten other identities found by Ramanujan in 1913. In particular he found the remarkable identity

Among other problems in elementary number theory, he is the author of a theorem that allowed him to get a 5328-digit number that is at present the largest known primitive weird number.

In applied mathematics his research interests include probability and simulation.

Selected research publications 

.

See also 
 Applications of randomness

References

External links 
 Giuseppe Melfi's home page
 The proof of conjectures on practical numbers and the joint work with Paul Erdős on Zentralblatt.
Tables of practical numbers  compiled by Giuseppe Melfi
Academic research query for "Giuseppe Melfi"

1967 births
20th-century Italian mathematicians
21st-century Italian mathematicians
Living people
Number theorists
Mathematicians from Sicily
Academic staff of the University of Neuchâtel